Amr Elnady (born 4 June 1975) is an Egyptian former professional road cyclist. He most notably won the Tour d'Egypte in 1999 and 2001 and the Tour of Saudi Arabia in 1999. He competed in the Men's Individual time trial at the 2000 Summer Olympics in Sydney where he finished 36th.

Major results

1996
 1st Overall Tour de Tunisie
1999
 National Road Championships
1st  Road race
1st  Time trial
 1st Overall Tour of Saudi Arabia
1st Prologue
 1st Overall Tour d'Egypte
1st Prologue & Stages 1 & 8
 1st Stage 7 Tour du Faso
2000
 National Road Championships
1st  Road race
1st  Time trial
 4th Overall Tour of Yugoslavia
 9th Overall Okolo Slovenska
2001
 1st Overall Tour d'Egypte
1st Stage 6
 8th Road race, African Road Championships

References 
Cycling news DOT com
ESPN

1975 births
Living people
Egyptian male cyclists
Cyclists at the 2000 Summer Olympics
Olympic cyclists of Egypt
Place of birth missing (living people)